The SureFire MGX is a light machine gun designed by Jim Sullivan, Bob Waterfield, Alan Ostrowski, Paul Latulippe Jr. and Hyunjung Samuel Eyssautier in 2002 and produced in prototype form only by ArmWest, LLC and marketed by SureFire, LLC as a technology demonstrator.

Overview
The SureFire MGX is a light machine gun featuring various elements from the many arms Sullivan designed in the past. The MGX is essentially a unified machine gun and rifle concept, similar to that of the Stoner 63 system. It is also noted to feature a very similar bolt components to the AR-15 and the various operations and quick change barrel of the Ultimax 100. The weapon fires from a closed bolt when firing semi-auto and from an open bolt when firing full-auto. The MGX features a stock that can fold both ways and can also be removed.

See Also
Stoner 63
Ultimax 100

References

The Rare Surefire MGX: A No-Recoil Light Machine Gun (LMG) -
SHOT Show 19 - SureFire MGX - Soldier Systems Daily
L. James Sullivan's Rifle Patent - The MGX -

Firearms articles needing expert attention
5.56×45mm NATO machine guns
Squad automatic weapons
Trial and research firearms of the United States